The term disjunct can refer to:
 disjunct (linguistics)
 disjunct or quincunx in astrology, an aspect made when two planets are 150 degrees, or five signs apart
 a disjunct distribution in biology, one in which two closely related taxa are widely separated geographically
 disjunct (music), a melodic skip or leap
 logical disjunction